Santiago Segura Silva (born 17 July 1965) is a Spanish filmmaker and actor. He also worked to a lesser extent as a television presenter, voice actor and comic book writer, as well as being a collector of original comic books.

At 12, he began making films with a Super-8 camera, and, after a recommendation from Fernando Trueba, began to make films in 35 mm, funded by his appearances in TV game shows.

He earned early recognition for his performance as a metalhead in 1995 film The Day of the Beast (billed as a "satanic comedy"), which won him the Goya Award for Best New Actor.

Great success would come with his directorial feature debut, 1998 dark action comedy and box-office hit Torrente, the Dumb Arm of the Law, in which he stars as José Luis Torrente, a racist, homophobic, xenophobic, and fascist former police cop. The film, that won Segura the Goya Award for Best New Director, was followed by four sequels (Torrente 2: Mission in Marbella, Torrente 3: El protector, Torrente 4: Lethal Crisis and Torrente 5: Operación Eurovegas) that made the highest-grossing Spanish film series.

He then went on to direct films with a lighter tone, likewise churning domestic box-office hits with children comedies such as Father There Is Only One (and its two sequels) and The Kids Are Alright.

Life and career
Santiago Segura Silva was born in Madrid on 17 July 1965. He was raised in the city's district of Carabanchel. After studying Arts at the Complutense University of Madrid, he decided to pursue a career as a filmmaker and in 1989 he directed the short Relatos de medianoche with a budget of 7000 pesetas (around US$50). In 1992 he went on to direct his first professional short Evilio, followed with Perturbado in 1993.

Segura is a recurring actor in the works of directors Alex de la Iglesia and Guillermo del Toro.

In 1993, he had a small role in Alex de la Iglesia's film Acción mutante. Two years later, he starred in El día de la Bestia, from the same director and that role made him famous in Spain. In 1998 he directed the film that brought him to stardom, Torrente: El brazo tonto de la ley (1998), in which he also acted as the lead character José Luis Torrente, a sleazy crime-fighter. Its popularity led to a sequel (Torrente 2: Misión en Marbella) and a computer game (Torrente: El juego).

Torrente 2: Misión en Marbella made €22,838,500 at the Spanish box office, becoming the highest grossing Spanish film of all time. Torrente 3: El protector, the third film in the series, was released in September 2005. Its advertising campaign parodied Batman Begins, using the phrase "Torrente Acabado" ("Torrente Finished"). Although he declared Torrente 3: El protector would be the last of the Torrente series, Torrente 4 was released in 2011. In 2010, he played the title role in El gran Vázquez, based on the life of the legendary cartoonist/wastrel Manuel Vázquez Gallego.

In 2014 he released Torrente 5: Operación Eurovegas with Alec Baldwin as guest star, and was the top release of 2014 in Spain.

He has since made his way into American culture by making appearances in movies such as Pacific Rim, Hellboy, Hellboy II: The Golden Army and Blade II (all of them by Del Toro), Perdita Durango (by De la Iglesia), Jack and Jill and Agent Cody Banks 2: Destination London.

He has also dubbed video games to Spanish, like Jack Black's role in Brütal Legend.

Because of his success, Santiago Segura has become a producer. He owns Amiguetes Entertainment company, he is associated with the theater in Estación del Norte in Madrid, and has produced Promedio rojo (2004) (featuring Nicolás López) and Aquí mando yo... y punto com.

In 2018 he appeared in the third season of MasterChef Celebrity. He was the 10th contestant to be eliminated.

Filmography

As filmmaker

Film

Producer only

Short film

As an actor

 Relatos de medianoche (1989, Short)
 Eduardo (1990, Short)
 Evilio (1992, Short)
 El cobrador del gas sólo llama una vez (1992, Short)
 Acción mutante (1993) .... Ezequiel
 Everyone Off to Jail (1993) .... Ecologista
 Perturbado (1993, Short)
 Todo es mentira (1994) .... Vendedor
 Evilio vuelve (1994, Short) .... Evilio
 Cuernos de mujer (1995) .... Ciego
 El día de la Bestia (1995) .... José María
 Two Much (1996) .... Paparazzi
 Matías, juez de línea (1996) .... Antidisturbios 1
 Killer Barbys (1996) .... Baltasar
 Tengo una casa (1996) .... Guardia 1
 La buena vida (1996)
 Sólo se muere dos veces (1997) .... Amilibia
 Airbag (1997) .... Candidato Paiño
 Perdita Durango (1997) .... Shorty Dee
 Torrente: El brazo tonto de la ley (1998, actor, writer and director) .... Torrente
 La niña de tus ojos (1998) .... Castillo
 Muertos de risa (1999) .... Nino
 París-Tombuctú (1999) .... El Cura
 Pídele cuentas al rey (1999) .... Vagabundo
 La mujer más fea del mundo (1999) .... El presidente de la República (uncredited)
 El corazón del guerrero (1999) .... Netheril / Carlos José
 Sabotage! (2000) .... Cyrille Léotard
 Obra maestra (2000) .... Benito Cañaveras
 Torrente 2: Misión en Marbella (2001, actor, writer, director and producer) .... Torrente
 Girl from Rio (2001) .... Paulo
 Manolito Gafotas en ¡Mola ser jefe! (2001) .... Himself (uncredited)
 Blade II (2002) .... Rush
 Asesino en serio (2002, co-producer) .... Padre Gorkisolo
 Zero/infinito (2002) .... (voice)
 El oro de Moscú (2003) .... Íñigo Fuentes
 Beyond Re-Animator (2003) .... Speedball
 Tiptoes (2003) .... Motel Manager
 Una de zombis (2003, actor and producer) .... Padre Pelayo / Entrecot / Himself
 Noin (2003) .... Himself
 Agent Cody Banks 2: Destination London (2004) .... Santiago
 Hellboy (2004) .... Train Driver
 Isi Disi (2004) .... Isi
 Promedio rojo (2004, producer) .... Doctor
 Di que sí (2004) .... Oscar Vázquez
 El asombroso mundo de Borjamari y Pocholo (2004, actor and producer) .... Borjamari
 Torrente 3: El protector (2005, actor, writer, director and producer) .... Torrente
 Bienvenido a casa (2006)
 La máquina de bailar (2006) .... Johnny
 Isi & Disi, alto voltaje (2006) .... Isi
 Ekipo Ja (2007) .... Santiago Segura
 Asterix at the Olympic Games (2008) .... Docteurmabus
 Hellboy II: The Golden Army (2008) .... Distinguished Buyer
 Manolete (2008) .... Guillermo
 King Shot (2009)
 Tensión sexual no resuelta (2010) .... Hacker (uncredited)
 The Last Circus (2010) .... Padre-Payaso tonto
 El gran Vázquez (2010) .... Vázquez
 Torrente 4: Lethal Crisis (2011) .... Torrente
 Koma (2011) .... Vendedor
 Jack and Jill (2011) .... Eduardo (uncredited)
 As Luck Would Have It (2011) .... David Solar
 Pa' Habbo (2011)
 El Chef (2012) .... Juan
 Pacific Rim (2013) .... Wizened Man
 Gente en sitios (2013)
 Witching & Bitching (2013) .... Miren
 Torrente V: Operación Eurovegas (2014) .... Torrente
 Pos eso (2014) .... Damián / Obispo / Satán (voice)
 Rey Gitano (2015) .... Conde de Segura
 The Strain (2015, TV Series) .... Evil Boxing Coach
 My Big Night (2015) .... Benítez
 Wild Oats (2016) .... Carlos
 The Queen of Spain (2016) .... Castillo
 Herederos de la bestia (2016)
 Casi leyendas (2017) .... Axel
 You Only Live Once (2017) .... Tobías López
 Los resucitados (2017) .... Don Lorenzo, Conde de Evilio
 Sin rodeos (2018)
 Padre no hay más que uno (2019) .... Javier

Accolades

References

External links

1965 births
Male actors from Madrid
Complutense University of Madrid alumni
Living people
Spanish male film actors
Spanish male comedians
Spanish stand-up comedians
Spanish film directors
20th-century Spanish male actors
21st-century Spanish male actors
20th-century Spanish screenwriters
20th-century Spanish male writers
21st-century Spanish screenwriters